The men's K-2 500 metres event was a pairs kayaking event conducted as part of the Canoeing at the 1988 Summer Olympics program.

Medalists

Results

Heats
22 crews were entered into the event on September 26. The top three finishers from each of the heats advanced directly to the semifinals while the remaining teams were relegated to the repechages. One team was disqualified during the heats.

Sweden's disqualification was not disclosed in the official report.

Repechages
The 12 crews first raced in two repechages on September 26. The top three finishers from each of the repechages advanced directly to the semifinals.

Semifinals
The top three finishers in each of the semifinals (raced on September 28) advanced to the final.

Final
The final was held on September 30.

References
1988 Summer Olympics official report Volume 2, Part 2. pp. 338–9. 
Sport-reference.com 1988 men's K-2 500 m results

Men's K-2 500
Men's events at the 1988 Summer Olympics